The 1934 Cork Senior Hurling Championship was the 46th staging of the Cork Senior Hurling Championship since its establishment by the Cork County Board in 1887. The draw for the opening round fixtures took place at the Cork Convention on 28 January 1934. The championship began on 25 March 1934 and ended on 7 October 1934.

St. Finbarr's were the defending champions. Divisional side Seandún fielded a team in the championship for the first time.

On 7 October 1934, Glen Rovers won the championship following a 3-2 to 0-6 defeat of St. Finbarr's in the final. This was their first championship title ever and the first of eight successive championship titles.

Results

First round

Second round

Semi-finals

Final

Statistics

Miscellaneous

 Seandún became the first divisional team to reach the semi-final stage of the championship.
 An attendance of 18,516 was officially returned for the final, however, thousands more are believed to have entered the grounds through various unauthorised entrances and it was estimated that almost 25,000 people were present. It was a new attendance record for a final.
 Glen Rovers win their first senior title

References

Cork Senior Hurling Championship
Cork Senior Hurling Championship